The 1993 Gator Bowl, a bowl game during the 1993 NCAA Division I-A football season, took place on December 31, 1993, at the Gator Bowl Stadium in Jacksonville, Florida. The competing teams were the Alabama Crimson Tide, representing the Southeastern Conference (SEC), and the North Carolina Tar Heels, representing the Atlantic Coast Conference (ACC). Alabama won the game 24–10. With sponsorship by Outback Steakhouse, the game was officially known as the Outback Gator Bowl.

Teams

Alabama

The 1993 Alabama squad opened the season ranked No. 2 only to tie with Tennessee in week six. The Crimson Tide went on to lose to both LSU and Auburn to finish the regular season with a record of 8–2–1. Although finishing second behind Auburn in the Western Division, as the Tigers were ineligible to play in the SEC Championship Game due to NCAA violations, Alabama played in the game for the second consecutive year. After losing to Florida for the SEC Championship, Alabama announced it accepted a bit to play in the Gator Bowl against North Carolina. The appearance marked the second for Alabama in the Gator Bowl.

In the week following the Iron Bowl, cornerback Antonio Langham was declared ineligible for both the SEC Championship Game and the Gator Bowl. In August 1995, the NCAA ruled that Langham was ineligible to participate with the Alabama squad retroactive to him signing with a sports agent following the 1992 season. As part of the NCAA sanctioned penalty, all games that Langham played in were officially forfeited changing their season record from 9–3–1 to 1–12 with the lone victory being over North Carolina in the Gator Bowl.

North Carolina

The 1993 North Carolina squad lost to both Florida State and Virginia to finish the regular season with a record of 10–2.

Game summary

References

1993–94 NCAA football bowl games
1993
1993
1993
20th century in Jacksonville, Florida
Bowl Coalition
Gator Bowl
December 1993 sports events in the United States